Dafne is a given name. Notable people with the name include:

Dafne Fernández (born 1985),  Spanish actress and dancer
Dafne Keen (born 2005), British-Spanish actress
Dafne Molina (born 1982), Mexican beauty pageant titleholder
Dafne Navarro (born 1996), Mexican trampoline gymnast
Dafne Schippers (born 1992), Dutch track and field athlete

See also
Dafni § People
Daphne (given name)